The men's C-1 1000 metres canoeing event at the 2019 Pan American Games was held between the 27 and 29 of July at the Albufera Medio Mundo in the city of Huacho.

Results

Heats

Qualification Rules: 1..2->Final, 3..6->Semifinals, Rest Out

Heat 1

Heat 2

Semifinal

Qualification Rules: 1..4->Final, Rest Out

Final

References

Canoeing at the 2019 Pan American Games